Sagay, officially the Municipality of Sagay,  is a 5th class municipality in the province of Camiguin, Philippines. According to the 2020 census, it has a population of 12,826 people.

History

The town square of Sagay includes a British cannon. This cannon has been dated at 1707, and is a nine-pounder Demi-Culverin. It can clearly be identified as British by the emblem on the top which includes the Tudor rose. It was possibly left behind in 1763 after the siege of Manila, and perhaps was brought to Camiguin by the Spanish to defend against Moro raiders.

In 1909, the municipality of Sagay was created. Prior to this date, Sagay town had been a part of the municipality of Catarman. Initially, Sagay municipality included the town of Guinsiliban, but that later became a municipality in its own right.

In 1942, the Japanese Occupation forces entered the town of Sagay, Camiguin.

In 1945, the town of Sagay was liberated by the invasion of the Filipino forces of the 6th and 10th Infantry Division of the Philippine Commonwealth Army who attacked the Japanese Imperial forces during the Battle of Camiguin at the end of World War II.

Geography

Climate

Barangays
Sagay is politically subdivided into 9 barangays.

 Alangilan
 Bacnit
 Balite
 Bonbon
 Bugang
 Cuña
 Manuyog
 Mayana
 Poblacion

Demographics

Economy

References

External links

 [ Philippine Standard Geographic Code]
Philippine Census Information

Municipalities of Camiguin